The third season of the American television series The Masked Singer premiered on Fox on February 2, 2020, as the Super Bowl LIV lead-out program, and concluded on May 20, 2020. The season was won by singer/TV personality Kandi Burruss as "Night Angel", with singer Jesse McCartney finishing second as "Turtle", and rapper Bow Wow placing third as "Frog".

Production
The third season featured 18 new costumes. In addition to creating more mobility within the costumes, Toybina described the season's style focus as "more fashion-forward and modern" compared to the superhero and experimental feel of the first and second seasons. A fan favorite costume from the first season, Monster, was reimagined as a female (Miss Monster) to create a "fun and outgoing" costume that kids would enjoy, while White Tiger was designed to resemble an Egyptian warrior "god of all gods."

The series's production crew had to work out better voice modulation routines as they had found fans of the show were able to remove the modulation and identify the speaking from previous seasons. Further, passionate fans of the show had been able to work out identities of the singers from early clue packages, so more difficult clue packages were created for the celebrities in the season. Filming occurred from December 19, 2019, to February 28, 2020.

Panelists and host

Nick Cannon, singer-songwriter Robin Thicke, television personality Jenny McCarthy Wahlberg, actor and comedian Ken Jeong, and recording artist Nicole Scherzinger returned for their third season as host and panelists.

Guest panelists included Jamie Foxx in the first episode, Jason Biggs in the second episode, Leah Remini in the third episode, Gabriel Iglesias in the fifth episode, season one winner, T-Pain, in the sixth episode, Joel McHale in the eighth episode, Will Arnett in the ninth episode, Yvette Nicole Brown in the eleventh episode, Sharon Osbourne in the twelfth episode, Gordon Ramsay in the thirteenth episode, Jeff Dye in the fourteenth episode, and Jay Pharoah in the fifteenth episode.

Contestants
During the season, eighteen contestants competed. The competitors were said to have a combined 69 Grammy nominations, 88 gold records, 11 Super Bowl appearances, three stars on the Hollywood Walk of Fame, hundreds of tattoos, and one title in the Guinness Book of World Records.

The first nine episodes featured the contestants broken into three groups, A, B and C; across three episodes, the remaining contestants in the group performed and the lowest-voted contestant forced to unmask themselves. The tenth episode saw the remaining nine contestants compete. The lowest-voted contestant from each group was put to a final vote to determine the contestant to be unmasked. For the eleventh and twelfth episodes, the eight contestants were split into two groups of four, and within that, two pairings. The lowest-voted contestant of each pairing in the group of four performed in a "smackdown" for a final vote to determine who would be unmasked. For the next three episodes, one of the remaining six contestants was eliminated each week, and the top three contestants competed in the finale episode.

Episodes

Week 1 (February 2 and 5)

Week 2 (February 12)
Group number: "Rock and Roll All Nite" by Kiss

Week 3 (February 19)

Week 4 (February 26)

Week 5 (March 4)
Group number: "Larger than Life" by Backstreet Boys

Week 6 (March 11)

Week 7 (March 18)

Week 8 (March 25)
Group number: "Let's Get Loud" by Jennifer Lopez

Week 9 (April 1)
Group number: "ABC" by The Jackson 5 (with altered lyrics)

Week 10 (April 8)

Week 11 (April 22)

Week 12 (April 29)

Week 13 (May 6)

Week 14 (May 13)

Group number: "The Best" by Tina Turner

Week 15 (May 20) – Finale

Ratings
The third season premiered as the Super Bowl LIV lead-out program and was viewed by over 27.3million people—by far the series' most watched episode. While the broadcast was watched by more than the previous lead-out, The World's Best (22.2million), and Fox's most recent lead-out, 2017's 24: Legacy (17.6million), it was lower than the viewership of This Is Us in 2018 (27million) and far lower than The Voice in 2012 (37.6million). During the latter half of the season which aired during the COVID-19 pandemic in the United States, the series—like others—experienced viewership and 18–49 rating gains of 10–15percent compared to the episodes that aired before the outbreak. Excluding the post-Super Bowl premiere, the two-hour April1 episode was the most watched since the first season's finale. Some, however, considered this increase unexpected due to the popularity of stripped-down performances during the numerous COVID-19 pandemic television specials that aired at the same time. A rival television executive said "if you had to predict which show was going to do well when the Living Room Concert and all that began, Masked Singer would be one of the last you'd choose." The season was watched by 25 percent more viewers and received a 25 percent higher 18–49 rating average than the second—the largest season-over-season increases of all television series broadcast during the 2019–20 television season. Among the more than 130 series aired, The Masked Singer was one of nine to increase in both figures, and one of only two to increase in both by 10 percent or more.

References

2020 American television seasons
The Masked Singer (American TV series)